6 Hours to Christmas is a Ghanaian romantic comedy film about Reggie, whose female colleague wants to give him a Christmas gift he finds hard to refuse.

Cast
 Chris Attoh
 Damilola Adegbite
 Benny Ashun
 Asamani Boateng
 Charles Cuammy
 Soul Knight Jazz
 Nii Odoi Mensah
 Marian Lempogo

References

Ghanaian comedy films
2010s English-language films
English-language Ghanaian films